Bouhlou may refer to:
Bouhlou, Algeria
Bouhlou, Morocco